Mieån is a river in Blekinge County and Kronoberg County, Sweden, which it flows south, into the Baltic Sea in the city of Karlshamn.

References

Rivers of Kronoberg County
Rivers of Blekinge County